Phlomoides tuberosa (syn. Phlomis tuberosa), the sage-leaf mullein, is a perennial herbaceous flowering plant in the family Lamiaceae, native to China, Kazakhstan, Kyrgyzstan, Mongolia, Russia; SW Asia and Europe. Enlarged, tuberous roots give rise to erect stems to 150 cm bearing purple-red flowers.

Chemistry
Phytochemical analyses of Phlomoides tuberosa leaves have found flavonoids apigenin, apigenin-7-O-glucuronide, luteolin, luteolin-7-O-glucoside, luteolin-7-О-glucuronide, orientin, isoorientin, phenylpropanoids acteoside (verbascoside), forsythoside B, decaffeoyl-acteoside, leucosceptoside A, marthynoside, neolignanes, iridoids sesamoside, 5-desoxy-sesamoside, shanzhiside methyl ester, lamalbide, 8-O-acetyl-shanzhiside, phloyoside I, chlorotuberoside, sterols, triterpenes oleanolic acid, ursolic acid. Dried leaves of plants collected in Buryatia yielded 0.02% of essential oil with a weak aroma with dominant phytol, linalool, eugenol and caryophyllene oxide. The seed has yielded 11.8% of oil, including 3.3% gadoleic acid and some fatty acids containing the unusual allene group, 25.1% laballenic acid and 2.9% phlomic acid. The roots shown the presence of oligosaccharides raffinose, stachyose, verbascose, flavonoids luteolin, linarin, quercitrin, phenylpropanoids acteoside, isoacteoside (isoverbascoside), forsythoside B, chlorogenic acid, decaffeoyl-acteosyde, iridoids shazhiside methyl ester, 8-O-acetyl-shanzhiside methyl ester, 8-O-acetyl-shanzhigenin methyl ester, floyoside I, phlotuberosides I and II, phlorigidoside C, diterpenes (abietanes, labdanes).

Cultivation
This plant is grown in full sun, but may tolerate some shade. The cultivar 'Amazone' has won the Royal Horticultural Society's Award of Garden Merit.

Uses
The Kalmyks are said to have eaten the cooked root, calling the plant bodmon sok. Another source for Mongolia has the plant used as a folk restorative medicine against intoxication, tuberculosis, pulmonary and cardiovascular diseases and rheumatoid arthritis. Buryat lamas used some part of the plant to treat diarrhoea, eye and lung disease and as a sedative.

Gallery

References

Lamiaceae
Root vegetables